Garrett Williams (born June 1, 2001) is an American football cornerback for the Syracuse Orange.

Early life and high school
Williams grew up in Harrisburg, North Carolina, and attended Hickory Ridge High School. He was rated a three-star recruit and committed to play college football at Syracuse University.

College career
Williams played in three games as a true freshman before redshirting the rest of the season. He became a starter going into his redshirt freshman season and was named honorable mention All-Atlantic Coast Conference (ACC) after making 64 tackles with a conference-leading 12 passes defended and two interceptions. Williams again led the ACC with ten passes broken up and also had 52 tackles and five tackles for loss in 2021.

References

External links
Syracuse Orange bio

2001 births
Living people
Players of American football from North Carolina
American football cornerbacks
Syracuse Orange football players